The 2nd Youth in Film Awards ceremony (now known as the Young Artist Awards), presented by the Youth in Film Association, honored outstanding youth performers in the fields of film, television and music for the 1979-1980 season, and took place on October 18, 1980, at the Sheraton Universal Hotel in Universal City, California, United States.

Established in 1978 by long-standing Hollywood Foreign Press Association member, Maureen Dragone, the Youth in Film Association was the first organization to establish an awards ceremony specifically set to recognize and award the contributions of performers under the age of 18 in the fields of film, television, theater, and music.

Categories
★ Bold indicates the winner in each category.

Best Young Performer in a Feature Film

Best Young Actor in a Major Motion Picture
★ Justin Henry - Kramer vs. Kramer
Christopher Atkins - The Blue Lagoon
Matt Dillon - My Bodyguard
Paul McCrane - Fame
Barry Miller - Fame
Ricky Schroder - The Last Flight of Noah's Ark

Best Young Actress in a Major Motion Picture
★ Diane Lane - Touched by Love
Jodie Foster - Foxes
Kristy McNichol - Little Darlings
Brooke Shields - The Blue Lagoon

Best Young Performer in a Television Special

Best Young Actor - TV Special
★ Michael Sharrett - Harvest - Faith For Today
Rossie Harris - Amber Waves - ABC
Evan H. Miranda - ABC Afterschool Special: The Seven Wishes of a Rich Kid - ABC
Robbie Rist - ABC Weekend Special: The Big Hex of Little Lulu - ABC

Best Young Actress - TV Special
★ Danielle Brisebois - Mom, the Wolfman and Me - Time-Life Television
Tonya Crowe - Joshua's World - ABC
Kristy McNichol - My Old Man - CBS
Melissa Michaelsen - Orphan Train - ABC

Best Young Performer in a Television Series

Best Young Actor in a Television Series
★ Adam Rich - Eight is Enough - ABC
Ira Angustain - The White Shadow - CBS
Gary Coleman - Diff'rent Strokes - NBC
Philip McKeon - Alice - CBS
Harold Pruett - The Tim Conway Show - CBS

Best Young Actress in a Television Series
★ Quinn Cummings - Family - ABC
Danielle Brisebois - Archie Bunker's Place - CBS
Missy Gold - Benson - ABC
Melissa Michaelsen - Me and Maxx - ABC
Dana Plato - Diff'rent Strokes - NBC
Natasha Ryan - Here's Boomer - NBC

Best Young Actor - Daytime TV Series
★ Philip Tanzini - General Hospital - ABC
John E. Dunn - All My Children - ABC
Jeremy Schoenberg - Days of Our Lives - NBC

Best Young Actress - Daytime TV Series
★ Genie Francis - General Hospital - ABC
Tracey Bregman - Days of Our Lives - NBC
Andrea Evans - One Life to Live - ABC
Dana Kimmell - Texas - NBC
Stacey Moran - Search For Tomorrow - CBS

Best Young Comedy Performer

Best Young Comedian
★ Gary Coleman - Diff'rent Strokes - NBC
Scott Baio - Happy Days - ABC
Rossie Harris - Airplane! - Paramount
Adam Rich - Eight is Enough - ABC

Best Young Comedienne
★ Kim Fields - The Facts of Life - NBC
Alison Arngrim - Little House on the Prairie - NBC
Valerie Bertinelli - One Day at a Time - CBS
Melissa Michaelsen - Me and Maxx - NBC
Jill Whelan - Airplane! - Paramount

Best Young Musical Recording Artist

Best Young Disc Artist - Male
★ Christopher Cross - Ride Like the Wind - W.B.
Shaun Cassidy - Wasp - W.B.
Leif Garrett - Surfin' USA - Atlantic
Paul McCrane - Fame - M.G.M.
Rex Smith - You Take My Breath Away - Columbia

Best Young Disc Artist - Female
★ Irene Cara - Fame - M.G.M.
Debby Boone - I'll Never Say Goodbye - W.B.
Rickie Lee Jones - Chuck E.'s In Love - W.B.
Dara Sedaka - In The Pocket

Best Family Entertainment

Best Major Motion Picture for Family Entertainment
★ Touched by Love - Columbia
Little Miss Marker - Universal
The Blue Lagoon - Columbia
The Last Flight of Noah's Ark - Disney
Xanadu - Universal

Best TV Special for Family Entertainment
★ Harvest - Faith for TodayAmber Waves - ABC
Goldie and the Boxer - NBC
The Long Days of Summer - ABC
Solid Gold - Channel 13

Best TV Series for Family Entertainment
★ Eight is Enough - ABCDiff'rent Strokes - NBC
Here's Boomer - NBC
Kids Are People Too - ABC
The Muppet Show - ITV

Best After School Television Special
★ NBC Special Treat: A Little Bit Different - NBCABC Afterschool Special: The Seven Wishes of a Rich Kid - ABC
ABC Weekend Special: The Big Hex of Little Lulu - ABC
End of a Dream

Best Family Music Album
★ Fame'' - MGMFoxes - United ArtistsCan't Stop the Music - CasablancaXanadu'' - Universal

Special Award

Greatest Contribution to Youth Through Entertainment Media
★ Carol Johnston

References

External links
Official site

Young Artist Awards ceremonies
1980 film awards
1980 television awards
1980 in American cinema
1980 in American television
1980 in California